The Saskatchewan Rattlers are a Canadian professional basketball team based in Saskatoon, Saskatchewan, that competes in the Canadian Elite Basketball League (CEBL).  They play their home games at the SaskTel Centre in Saskatoon.

History
On May 2, 2018 the Canadian Elite Basketball League announced a team would compete in Saskatoon, Saskatchewan. 
 

On July 3, 2018, it was announced that the team will be called the Saskatchewan Rattlers. Saskatchewan joins Edmonton, Hamilton, Guelph, Niagara, and Abbotsford as one of the six original franchises for the inaugural season of the CEBL. 

The Rattlers won the 2019 CEBL championship and were the inaugural champions of the league. They beat Hamilton Honey Badgers 94–83 in the final.

On January 19, 2022, the Rattlers signed Dean Demopoulos as its new head coach.

Roster

Current roster

Notable players

  Tony Carr

Honours
CEBL
Champions (1): 2019

Season-by-season record

References

External links 
 Official website

Sports teams in Saskatchewan
Basketball teams established in 2018
2018 establishments in Saskatchewan
Basketball in Saskatchewan
Sport in Saskatoon
Canadian Elite Basketball League teams